Curtis Pulley (born November 21, 1986) is a former American football quarterback for the Florida A&M University Rattlers. Pulley used to be a quarterback and wide receiver for the University of Kentucky Wildcats. He was selected as the 2004 Kentucky Mr. Football.

High school 

As a four-year letterman and three-year starter at quarterback and safety at Hopkinsville High School, his career passing statistics were 379 completions in 737 attempts for 6,016 yards and 62 touchdowns. His rushing totals include 487 attempts for 3,043 yards and 54 touchdowns. As a defensive back, he accounted for 155 tackles, 10 interceptions (two returned for touchdowns), two fumble recoveries (one for touchdown), and 13 pass breakups.

In 2004, Pulley was named Kentucky's Mr Football.

College
After holding the starting position for the Kentucky Wildcats football coming out of Spring Camp in 2006, QB Andre Woodson beat him for the spot in the fall.  For the 2006 season, Pulley served as the backup quarterback, occasional wide receiver, and special teams kick blocker for the Wildcats. He left the team for the spring semester 2007, but later re-enrolled for the Fall.  He decided to redshirt the 2007 season and try to regain the starting spot in 2008. He was considered one of the top athletes on the team, and at 6'4 212 lbs, can play either receiver or Quarterback.

On August 5, 2008 Curtis Pulley was dismissed from the Kentucky Wildcat football team as a result of marijuana charges and an arrest for traffic charges including speeding, driving on a suspended or revoked license and having expired or no plates or registration papers.

Pulley has since transferred to Florida A&M University. He was named MEAC Offensive Player of the Year in 2009.

References

1986 births
Living people
American football quarterbacks
American football wide receivers
Kentucky Wildcats football players
Florida A&M Rattlers football players
Sportspeople from Hopkinsville, Kentucky
People from Laurens, South Carolina